The 2018 Rally de Portugal (formally known as the Vodafone Rally de Portugal 2018) was a motor racing event for rally cars that was held over four days between 17 and 20 May 2018. It marked the fifty-second running of Rally de Portugal, and was the sixth round of the 2018 FIA World Rally Championship and its support categories, the WRC-2 and WRC-3 championships, and the third round of the Junior WRC championship. The event was based in Matosinhos in Porto and consisted of twenty special stages totalling  competitive kilometres. The event was also part of the Portuguese national championship (first 9 stages) and Peugeot Rally Cup Ibérica (first 12 stages); their participants did not feature in the overall placings.

Sébastien Ogier and Julien Ingrassia were the defending rally winners. Thierry Neuville and Nicolas Gilsoul were the rally winners. Their team, Hyundai Shell Mobis WRT, were the manufacturers' winners. The Škoda Motorsport crew of Pontus Tidemand and Jonas Andersson won the World Rally Championship-2 category in a Škoda Fabia R5, while Swedish crew Denis Rådström and Johan Johansson won the World Rally Championship-3 and Junior World Rally Championship.

Background

Championship standings prior to the event
Sébastien Ogier and Julien Ingrassia entered the round with a ten-point lead in the World Championship for Drivers and Co-drivers. In the World Championship for Manufacturers, Hyundai Shell Mobis WRT held a fifteen-point lead over M-Sport Ford WRT.

Entry list
The following crews were entered into the rally. The final entry list consisted of fourteen World Rally Cars, seventeen World Rally Championship-2 entries, and fourteen entries in the World Rally Championship-3. All of the World Rally Championship-3 drivers and co-drivers were eligible to score points in the Junior World Rally Championship.

Notes
 — Driver and co-driver are eligible to score points in the FIA Junior World Rally Championship.

Report

Pre-event

Haydon Paddon and Sebastian Marshall returned to the championship with Hyundai. Paddon and Marshall had previously contested Rally Sweden before handing the car over to Dani Sordo and Carlos del Barrio for the next three events as part of a drive-sharing agreement in the team. As part of the agreement, Paddon and Sordo will contest seven events each, leading Hyundai to enter a fourth i20 Coupe WRC in Rally de Portugal to allow both crews to compete in seven rallies.

Mads Østberg and Torstein Eriksen returned to the championship, making their second appearance of the season with Citroën.

Thursday
Argentina winner Ott Tänak defeated Andreas Mikkelsen, who set fifth fastest time, in front of 30,000 fans in their head-to-head heat and topped his Yaris by 0.4 second. Defending world champion Sébastien Ogier and his Fiesta teammate Teemu Suninen tied in second, while Kris Meeke finished fourth. Last year runner-up Thierry Neuville completed in sixth, while Elfyn Evans was another one tenth of a second behind. Dani Sordo finished eighth in the fourth Hyundai. Returned Mads Østberg was in ninth, while Esapekka Lappi completed the top ten.

Friday
It was full of dramas in Friday of the rally. Ott Tänak first retired from the rally due to hitting a rock, which damaged his engine's cooling system. Next was his teammate Jari-Matti Latvala, who hit a rock and broke his front right suspension. Defending world champion Sébastien Ogier was fourth on the road until he fell off the road in his Fiesta. Hayden Paddon was the rally reader after SS6. However, a heavy impact damaged the front left of his Hyundai i20 and blocked the stage. Teammate Andreas Mikkelsen suffered power steering and engine issues and retired from the day.

Back to the front, Thierry Neuville was the rally reader. Elfyn Evans completed the day in the second place, 17.7 seconds off the lead. Dani Sordo, who had to slow down as his soft tyres became worn, was another 6.6 seconds behind. Teemu Suninen finished in fourth after a consistent performance. Esapekka Lappi and Mads Østberg separated by two and a half seconds in fifth and sixth. Tyre troubles forced Kris Meeke to drive the final Porto stages with just a wheel rim on the rear left of his car and he conceded a minute. Teammate Craig Breen dropped from third to eighth after a puncture. WRC-2 category leader Gus Greensmith and Łukasz Pieniążek completed the top ten.

Saturday
Kris Meeke started the day in seventh, but he crashed his Citroën C3 on SS12. Fortunately, both Meeke and co-driver Paul Nagle were unhurt. Thierry Neuville ended the day with a 39.8-second advantage over Elfyn Evans. Chances are that the Hyundai star is going to snatch the position of the championship leader from the defending world champion Sébastien Ogier, who ran under WRC-2 rule as well as Andreas Mikkelsen and Jari-Matti Latvala today, after the rally. Teemu Suninen just edged Dani Sordo, who stiffened his Hyundai i20's set-up, by 4.7 seconds in third after the Spaniard received a 10-second penalty from stewards late on Saturday night for dislodging two bales on a Porto street stage roundabout in SS8 on Friday night. Esapekka Lappi completed the day in fifth in a Toyota, another 11.1 seconds behind. Mads Østberg and teammate Craig Breen, who had to clear the road today, completed the day in sixth and seventh place respectively, followed by WRC-2 leader Pontus Tidemand, Łukasz Pieniążek and Stéphane Lefebvre.

Sunday
Thierry Neuville took his first Portugal and eighth WRC victory after a four-day battle. Because of championship leader Sébastien Ogier did not manage to score any points, he now leads the championship over the defending world championship by nineteen points. Ford teammates Elfyn Evans and Teemu Suninen, who reach his first podium, finished second and third to help the team narrow the gap to Hyundai to thirteen points. Esapekka Lappi, who took another Power Stage win, overtook Dani Sordo to completed the event in fourth in a Yaris. However, he was given a ten-second penalty for displacing one of the three dividing bales on SS9's third roundabout later on. As a result, he lost his fourth place to the Spaniard. Mads Østberg and teammate Craig Breen finished in sixth and seventh overall, which brought some valuable points to Citroën, while WRC-2 leader Pontus Tidemand, Łukasz Pieniążek and Stéphane Lefebvre completed the leaderboard.

Classification

Top ten finishers
The following crews finished the rally in each class's top ten.

Other notable finishers
The following notable crews finished the rally outside top ten.

Special stages

Power stage
The Power stage was an 11.18 km stage at the end of the rally. Additional World Championship points were awarded to the five fastest crews.

J-WRC stage winning crews 
Junior World Rally Championship crews scored additional points. Each of the fastest stage time was awarded with one bonus point.

Penalties
The following notable crews were given time penalty during the rally.

Retirements
The following notable crews retired from the event. Under Rally2 regulations, they were eligible to re-enter the event starting from the next leg. Crews that re-entered were given an additional time penalty.

Championship standings after the rally

Drivers' championships

Co-Drivers' championships

Manufacturers' and teams' championships

Notes

References

External links

  
 2018 Rally de Portugal in e-wrc website
 The official website of the World Rally Championship

Portugal
2018 in Portuguese motorsport
Portugal
2018 Rally de Portugal